North Dalton is a village and civil parish in the East Riding of Yorkshire, England. North Dalton itself lies on the B1246 road.

According to the 2011 UK census, North Dalton parish had a population of 302, a reduction on the 2001 UK census figure of 315.

The church dedicated to All Saints was designated a Grade II* listed building in 1966 and is now recorded in the National Heritage List for England, maintained by Historic England.

In 1823 North Dalton was in the Wapentake of Harthill. All Saints was an episcopal chapel. There was also a Methodist chapel. Population was 398, with occupations including the landlady of The Star public house, a schoolmaster, a tailor, four farmers, and two blacksmiths, carpenters, corn millers, shoemakers and shopkeepers. A carrier operated between the village and Beverley once a week.

References

External links

Villages in the East Riding of Yorkshire
Civil parishes in the East Riding of Yorkshire